KKHK (95.5 FM, "Bob FM") is a commercial radio station in Carmel, California, broadcasting to the Santa Cruz-Monterey-Salinas, California area on 95.5 FM. Owned by Stephens Media Group, through licensee SMG-Monterey, LLC, it broadcasts an Alternative format. Its studios are in Monterey while its transmitter is located east of the city.

History
95.5 FM had been a classical music station branded as "K-Bach" until February 9, 2008, when the format was moved to 103.9 FM. On February 14, 2008, the call sign on 103.9 FM temporarily changed to KKHK which were then swapped with KBOQ on February 26.

On December 3, 2010 KKHK changed their format from country as Hank FM, to adult hits branded as "Bob FM".

On July 1, 2019, Mapleton Communications announced its intent to sell its remaining 37 stations to Stephens Media Group. Stephens began operating the station that same day.  The sale was consummated on September 30, 2019. Upon the closure of the acquisition, the new owners flipped the station to classic hits, still under the Bob FM branding.

Currently, the station airs an Alternative format. The station has retained the "Bob FM" name, but now uses the slogan "The 90s to Now."

See also
For information about prior use of KKHK, see KQMT, KYYS and KDFG

References

External links

KHK
Bob FM stations
Alternative rock radio stations in the United States